Pauli Vesterinen (20 November 1923 – 8 August 2005) was a Finnish athlete. He competed in the men's javelin throw at the 1948 Summer Olympics.

References

1923 births
2005 deaths
People from Vyborg District
Athletes (track and field) at the 1948 Summer Olympics
Finnish male javelin throwers
Olympic athletes of Finland